"All About You" is a song by American EDM duo The Knocks featuring American indie pop band Foster the People, it was released on October 28, 2020. The song was written by Styalz Fuego, Benjamin Ruttner, James Patterson, Luke O'Loughlin and Mark Foster, the lead singer of Foster the People, and produced by Fuego and The Knocks. It also marks the second collaboration between the artists.

Background
Mark Foster, lead singer of Foster the People, said in a press release: "When I was in New York a few months ago, I popped over to say hi to The Knocks guys, as I hadn't caught up with them in a while. [...] We were hanging at their studio, playing various things for each other that we had been working on. One of those songs was a rough instrumental version of 'All About You'. I put a bass line and a chord change on it, and was surprised when they sent me a fully realized song a few months later." He then completed the track remotely at his studio located in Los Angeles.

Content
Ben Ruttner of the Knocks explained in an interview that the song is based on a beat made from T. L. Barrett's song "Like a Ship" (1988). The song is written in the key of G♯ Major, with a tempo of 102 beats per minute.

Music video
The music video was released on January 13, 2021, and directed by Nathan R. Smith. It showcases Foster and others "walk[ing] along dark city streets" appearing "downtrodden".

Charts

Weekly charts

Year-end charts

References

2021 singles
2021 songs
The Knocks songs
Foster the People songs
Songs written by Mark Foster (singer)